Bulgaria competed at the 2015 World Championships in Athletics in Beijing, China, from 22 to 30 August 2015.

Results
(q – qualified, NM – no mark, SB – season best)

Men
Track and road events

Field events

Women 
Track and road events

Field events

Sources 
Bulgarian team

Nations at the 2015 World Championships in Athletics
World Championships in Athletics
2015